I, the Mask is the thirteenth studio album by Swedish heavy metal band In Flames, released on 1 March 2019. It is the band's first release since Whoracle (1997) without longtime bassist Peter Iwers, and the last to feature Joe Rickard on drums. It is the debut album for bassist Bryce Paul and drummer Tanner Wayne. It is also the last album to feature guitarist Niclas Engelin.

A chiptune reimagined version of the album (programmed by Sam Brown) was released in March 2020 via Better Noise Music to celebrate the album's first anniversary.

Loudwire named it one of the 50 best metal albums of 2019.

Track listing

Personnel

In Flames
 Anders Fridén – vocals
 Björn Gelotte – lead guitar
 Niclas Engelin – rhythm guitar
 Bryce Paul Newman – bass
 Tanner Wayne – drums 
Additional musicians
 Joe Rickard – drums 
 Örjan Örnkloo – programming
 Howard Benson – keyboards 

Production and design
 Howard Benson − producer
 Mike Plotnikoff − recording
 Trevor Dietrich − engineering 
 Zach Darf − engineering 
 Hatsukazu "Hatch" Inagaki − recording
 Paul Decarli − digital editing
 Chris Lord-Alge − mixing
 Ted Jensen − mastering
 Blake Armstrong − artwork

Charts

References

2019 albums
In Flames albums